The My Songs Tour is a world tour by British singer-songwriter Sting, in support of his thirteenth solo studio album My Songs, released on 24 May 2019. The tour began on 28 May 2019 at La Seine Musicale in Paris, France, and went on until 17 November 2019 at The Met in Philadelphia. The tour was due to resume in 2020 with a (rescheduled) 8-date residency from 15 August to 2 September at Caesars Palace in Las Vegas but was postponed and rescheduled to August 2020 and then to 2021 due to the COVID-19 pandemic. 

Curiously, this tour was not renamed The Bridge Tour after the release in November 2021 of Sting's new studio album (of original material) The Bridge although the 2022 ongoing tour setlist does include up to 5 songs from the new studio album. 

It was preceded by two pre-tour one-off shows on May 10 and 12, 2019, in Texas.

Set list 2019
This set list is representative of the performance on 2 July 2019 in Budapest, Hungary. It does not represent the set list at all concerts for the duration of the tour.

"Message in a Bottle"
"If I Ever Lose My Faith in You"
"Englishman in New York"
"If You Love Somebody Set Them Free"
"Every Little Thing She Does Is Magic"
"Brand New Day"
"Spirits in the Material World"
"Seven Days"
"Fields of Gold"
"Waiting for the Break of Day"
"Shape of My Heart"
"Wrapped Around Your Finger"
"Walking on the Moon"
"So Lonely"
"Desert Rose"
"Roxanne"
"Demolition Man"
"Can't Stand Losing You"
"Every Breath You Take"
Encore
"King of Pain"
"Next to You"
"Fragile"

Set list 2022
This set list is representative of the performance on 25 March 2022 in Amsterdam, Holland, The Netherlands. It does not represent the set list at all concerts for the duration of the tour.

"Russians" 
"Message in a Bottle"
"If I Ever Lose My Faith in You"
"Englishman in New York"
"Every Little Thing She Does Is Magic"
"If It's Love" 
"For Her Love"
"Loving You"
"The Book of Numbers"
"Rushing Water"
"Fields of Gold"
"Brand New Day"
"Shape of My Heart"
"Wrapped Around Your Finger"
"Walking on the Moon" / "Get Up, Stand Up"
"So Lonely" / "No Woman, No Cry" 
"Desert Rose"
"King of Pain" 
"Every Breath You Take"
Encore
"Roxanne" / "It Don't Mean A Thing (If It Ain't Got That Swing)"
"Driven to Tears"
"Fragile"

Personnel
In August 2019, touring members of his band included:

 Dominic Miller: guitar
 Rufus Miller: guitar 
 Josh Freese: drums
 Zach Jones: drums 
 Kevon Webster: keyboards
 Shane Sager: harmonica
 Gene Noble, Melissa Musique: backup vocalists

Tour dates 2019

Tour dates 2020

Tour dates 2021

Tour dates 2022

Tour dates 2023

Notes

References

External links

 – official site

2019 concert tours
2021 concert tours
2022 concert tours
2023 concert tours